Antón Garrote (born 17 August 1972) is a Spanish sailor. He competed in the Laser event at the 1996 Summer Olympics.

References

External links
 

1972 births
Living people
Spanish male sailors (sport)
Olympic sailors of Spain
Sailors at the 1996 Summer Olympics – Laser
Place of birth missing (living people)
Sportspeople from A Coruña